The Museum of Northern British Columbia is a museum in Prince Rupert, British Columbia, Canada.

The museum is housed in a large cedar wood longhouse where it collects and exhibits the culture and history of the indigenous peoples of the Pacific Northwest Coast.  It was founded in 1924 and now houses thousands of artifacts, maps, photographs and other material.  It also organises archaeological and historical tours such as a visit to the Tsimshian village of Metlakatla.

Gallery

References

1924 establishments in British Columbia
Museums established in 1924
History museums in British Columbia
Prince Rupert, British Columbia